Tropomodulin-1 is a protein that in humans is encoded by the TMOD1 gene.

References

Further reading

Tropomodulin